Sar Joulaki Rural District is a rural district (dehestan) in Joulaki District, Aghajari County, Khuzestan Province, Iran. At the 2011 census, its population was 3637, in 869 families. The rural district has 3 villages.

References 

Aghajari County